Korablyova is a rural locality in Katyrinsky Selsoviet Rural Settlement, Oktyabrsky District, Kursk Oblast, Russia. Population:

Geography 
The village is located in the Seym River basin (a left tributary of the Desna), 67 km from the Russia–Ukraine border, 21 km south-west of Kursk, 5 km west of the district center – the urban-type settlement Pryamitsyno, at the еаstern border of the selsoviet center – Mitrofanova.

 Climate
Korablyova has a warm-summer humid continental climate (Dfb in the Köppen climate classification).

Transport 
Korablyova is located 15.5 km from the federal route  Crimea Highway (a part of the European route ), on the road of regional importance  (Kursk – Lgov – Rylsk – border with Ukraine), in the vicinity of the railway halt 439 km (railway line Lgov I — Kursk).

The rural locality is situated 33 km from Kursk Vostochny Airport, 120 km from Belgorod International Airport and 235 km from Voronezh Peter the Great Airport.

References

Notes

Sources

Rural localities in Oktyabrsky District, Kursk Oblast